Thornycroft, Thorneycroft, or Thornicroft may refer to:

Thornycroft family
Thornycroft family, British arts and industry family
 Thomas Thornycroft (1815–85), sculptor
 his wife Mary Thornycroft (1814–95), sculptor
 John Isaac Thornycroft (1843–1928), son of Thomas, marine engineer
 John Edward Thornycroft (1872–1960), son of John Isaac, mechanical and civil engineer
 Isaac Thomas Thornycroft (1881–1955), son of John Isaac, motorboat and yacht racer, 1908 Olympic gold medalist in motor boating
 Helen Thornycroft (1848–1937), daughter of Thomas, painter
 Hamo Thornycroft RA (1850–1925), son of Thomas, sculptor
 Theresa Thornycroft (1853–1947), daughter of Thomas, sculptor, mother of Siegfried Sassoon

Other people
 Alexander Thorneycroft (1859–1931), British Army general
 Carla Thorneycroft, Baroness Thorneycroft (1914–2007), British patron of the arts
 Charles Thorneycroft (1879–1972), English cricketer
 Craig Thornicroft, former drummer for dance-punk band Youves
 Diana Thorneycroft (born 1956), Canadian artist
 Elizabeth Thornicroft (fl. 1723), wife of George Nevill, 14th Baron Bergavenny
 Gaston Thornicroft (fl.1930s–1960s), businessman and Coloured activist in Southern Rhodesia
 George Benjamin Thorneycroft (1791–1851), ironmaster and Tory supporter who became the first Mayor of Wolverhampton, after the Borough was incorporated, in 1848
 Harry Scott Thornicroft (fl.1900s–1930s), colonial administrator in Northern Rhodesia
 Harry Thorneycroft (1892–1956) British Labour politician
 John Thornicroft, conductor of the Regina Symphony Orchestra 1955–1958
 Nick Thornicroft (born 1985), English cricketer
 Micheen Thornycroft (born 1987), Zimbabwean rower
 Peter Thorneycroft, Baron Thorneycroft (1909–1994), British Conservative politician
 Wallace Thorneycroft (1864–1954), mining engineer and geologist

Companies
Thornycroft, vehicle manufacturer separated from the shipbuilding company in the early 20th century
John I. Thornycroft & Company, shipbuilder started by John Isaac Thornycroft, subsequently VT Group

Football clubs
Thornycroft Athletic F.C., in Basingstoke, founded by employees of the vehicle manufacturer
Thornycrofts (Woolston) F.C., in Woolston, Southampton, founded by employees of the shipbuilder
Vosper Thornycroft F.C., in Sholing, Southampton now known as Sholing F.C.

Other
Thorneycroft carbine, 1901 bullpup design rifle